{{DISPLAYTITLE:1L-chiro-Inositol}}

1L-chiro-Inositol (L-chiro-Inositol) is one of the isomers of inositol.

See also
allo-Inositol
cis-Inositol
1D-chiro-Inositol
epi-Inositol
muco-Inositol
neo-Inositol
scyllo-Inositol

References

Inositol